The relationship between religion and lesbian, gay, bisexual, and transgender (LGBT) people can vary greatly across time and place, within and between different religions and sects, and regarding different forms of homosexuality, bisexuality, non-binary, and transgender identities. More generally, the relationship between religion and sexuality ranges widely among and within them, from giving sex and sexuality a rather negative connotation to believing that sex is the highest expression of the divine.

According to sociologists and researchers in social sciences, religion plays an important role in how heteronormative societies view LGBTQ+ people and same-sex couples, and their abilities to be functional beings in societal contexts. Some of the authoritative bodies, texts, and doctrines of the world's largest religions may view these negatively, especially those that belong to Abrahamic religions. This can range from discrimination and discouragement of self-disclosure directed at LGBTQ+ people, explicitly forbidding same-sex sexual activities and/or gender reassignment among adherents, actively opposing social acceptance of LGBTQ+ identities, to the criminalization and violence against LGBTQ+ people, such as death penalty for people engaging in homosexual practices while tolerating gender reassignment in specific cases.

Liberal and progressive voices within these religions tend to view LGBTQ+ people more positively, and some liberal religious denominations may bless same-sex marriages, as well as accepting and marrying people who are transgender. Historically, some cultures and religions accommodated, institutionalized, revered and/or tolerated same-sex relationships and non-heterosexual identities; such mythologies and traditions can be found in numerous religions around the world; elements of religious and cultural incorporation of non-heterosexual identities can still be identified in traditions that have survived into the modern era, such as the Berdache, Hijra, and Xanith.

Religious views of LGBT people
According to a 2006 Australian survey, LGBTQ+ Australians, compared to the general Australian population, were much more likely to have no religious affiliation, much less likely to be affiliated with a Christian denomination, and more likely to be affiliated with a non-Christian religion. The distribution of religions that LGBTQ+ Australians were raised in, however, was similar to that of the general population. Men, particularly bisexual men, were more likely to be Christian and more likely to have stayed in the same religion. Lesbian women were more likely to have left the religion they were raised in and be currently unaffiliated.

A 2007 academic research on the beliefs of LGBTQ+ New Zealanders found that 73% had no religious affiliation, 14.8% were Christian, and 2.2% were Buddhist. In contrast, a 2001 census reported that the general New Zealand population reported that 59.8% were Christian and 29.2% had no religious affiliation. When looking at change since 1966, LGBTQ+ people are disaffiliating from Christianity at a rate 2.37 times higher compared to the rate of the general population in New Zealand. In the survey, 59.8% of New Zealanders reported a belief in a spiritual force, god, or gods; this differed significantly by gender, with 64.9% of women and 55.5% of men reporting such a belief.

The Radical Faeries are a worldwide queer spiritual movement, founded in 1979 in the United States. Radical Faerie communities are generally inspired by aboriginal, native, or traditional spiritualities, especially those that incorporate queer sensibilities.

Religious groups and public policy

Opposition to same-sex marriage and LGBT rights is often associated with conservative religious views. The American Family Association and other religious groups have promoted boycotts of corporations whose policies support the LGBT community.

On the other hand, the Unitarian Universalist Association supports the freedom to marry and compares resistance to it to the resistance to abolition of slavery, women's suffrage, and the end of anti-miscegenation laws.

Lesbians and gay men face particular problems in conservative Islamic nations where laws generally prohibit same-sex sexual behavior; where interpretation of Sharia Law on male homosexuality carries the death penalty, with this form of discrimination being viewed as a breach of human rights by international human rights experts and human rights organisations such as Amnesty International.

With the signature of the US in 2009, the proposed UN declaration on LGBT rights has now been signed by 67 members of the United Nations. There was an opposing statement put forward by Muslim nations, and this has been signed by 57 member states, the majority being in Africa and Asia. 68 out of the total 192 countries have not yet signed either statement.

Views of specific religions

Abrahamic religions
Abrahamic religions (namely Judaism, Samaritanism, Christianity, the Baháʼí Faith, and Islam) have traditionally affirmed and endorsed a patriarchal and heteronormative approach towards human sexuality, favouring exclusively penetrative vaginal intercourse between men and women within the boundaries of marriage over all other forms of human sexual activity, including autoeroticism, masturbation, oral sex, non-penetrative and non-heterosexual sexual intercourse (all of which have been labeled as "sodomy" at various times), believing and teaching that such behaviors are forbidden because they're considered sinful, and further compared to or derived from the behavior of the alleged residents of Sodom and Gomorrah. However, the status of LGBT people in early Christianity and early Islam is debated.

Christianity

The Hebrew Bible/Old Testament and its traditional interpretations in Judaism and Christianity have historically affirmed and endorsed a patriarchal and heteronormative approach towards human sexuality, favouring exclusively penetrative vaginal intercourse between men and women within the boundaries of marriage over all other forms of human sexual activity, including autoeroticism, masturbation, oral sex, non-penetrative and non-heterosexual sexual intercourse (all of which have been labeled as "sodomy" at various times), believing and teaching that such behaviors are forbidden because they're considered sinful, and further compared to or derived from the behavior of the alleged residents of Sodom and Gomorrah.

Throughout the majority of Christian history, most Christian theologians and denominations have considered homosexual behavior as immoral or sinful. Currently, Christian denominations have a variety of beliefs about LGBT people, and the moral status of same-sex sexual practices and gender variance. LGBT people may be barred from membership, accepted as laity, or ordained as clergy, depending on the denomination.  

The Roman Catholic Church welcomes people attracted to the same sex, while maintaining its teaching that homosexual relationships and acts are sinful. The Roman Curia considers transgender individuals to be their biological sex and admits no distinction between "sex" and "gender". The Orthodox Church holds similar stances on same-sex attraction and conjugal relations. Protestant denominations have a wide range of views. Some denominations espouse similar views to Catholicism and Orthodoxy, and teach that all sexual relations outside of traditional marriage between a man and a woman are sinful, such as the Reformed Church in America, Southern Baptist Convention, The Church of Jesus Christ of Latter-day Saints and Jehovah's Witnesses.

In the Jehovah's witness branch of Christianity, LGBTQ is seen as something to be shamed.  Within a study of 245 Jehovah's witnesses, 76% agreed that LGBTQ practices should be discouraged, while only 16% thought these ideas should be encouraged.  The remaining 8% seemed to have no opinion or were neutral on the situation.  Another study was conducted on Jehovah's witnesses with a range of ages from 18-29, 30-49, 50-64,65+.  The majority of those who were against LGBTQ practices came from the 30-49 age range, with the percentage being 34%.  Jehovah's witnesses can be 'disfellowshipped,' leading to ostracism from former support and social groups.  'Disfellowshipping' can occur if sin is committed that is seen as weighty and is not repented for.  Homosexual or LGBTQ practices would fall under the category of a sin which could lead to disfellowshipping.  Within a survey of 187 Jehovah's witnesses, 90% strongly opposed same-sex marriage and would classify it as something against their religion.    

Other Christian churches, such as the Church of England, United Church of Canada, the United Church of Christ, the Presbyterian Church (U.S.A.), the Evangelical Lutheran Church in Canada, the Evangelical Lutheran Church in America, the Lutheran Church of Sweden, the Lutheran Church of Denmark, the Lutheran Church in Norway, the Lutheran Church of Iceland, the Protestant Church of the Netherlands, the United Protestant Church in Belgium, the United Protestant Church of France, the German Lutheran, Reformed and United Churches in Evangelical Church in Germany, the Old Catholic Church, the Anglican Church in Canada, the Episcopal Church in United States, and the Scottish Episcopal Church don't consider same-sex relations immoral, and will ordain LGBT clergy and celebrate blessings of same-sex marriages. Liberal Quakers, those in membership of Britain Yearly Meeting and Friends General Conference in the United States, approve of same-sex marriage and union and conduct same-sex marriage ceremonies in the United Kingdom.

Unitarian Universalism

Unitarian Universalism and the Unitarian Universalist Association (UUA) have a long-standing tradition of welcoming LGBT people.  The first ordained minister of any religion in the US or Canada to come out was the Rev. James Stoll in 1969. There have been UUA resolutions supporting people regardless of sexual orientation since 1970, and a popular program of becoming a "Welcoming Congregation" since 1989. The UUA has officially supported UUA clergy performing Services of Union between same-sex couples since 1984, and has supported same-sex marriage since 1996.

The Canadian Unitarian Council (CUC) similarly operates a Gender and Sexual Diversity Monitoring Group and, like the UUA (of which it became autonomous in 2002), has Welcoming Congregations. The Canadian Unitarian Universalist congregations perform same-sex marriages and the CUC supports this work through its Lay Chaplaincy program.

Judaism

The American branch of Conservative Judaism formally approves of same-sex marriage ceremonies. As of 1992 with the Report of the Reconstructionist Commission on Homosexuality, the Reconstructionist Movement of Judaism has expressed its support for same-sex marriages as well as the inclusion of gay and lesbian people in all aspects of Jewish life. The Jewish Reconstructionist Federation leaves the choice of whether or not to perform same-sex marriages to individual rabbis but the procedure is included in the Reconstructionist Rabbi's Manual and many choose to use the traditional language and symbols of kiddushin. Reform Judaism, the largest Jewish denomination in the United States, is generally supportive of LGBT rights and marriage.

Islam

Attitudes toward LGBTQ+ people and their experiences in the Muslim world have been influenced by its religious, legal, social, political, and cultural history. The religious stigma and sexual taboo associated with homosexuality in Islamic societies can have profound effects for those Muslims who self-identify as LGBTQ+. Today, most LGBTQ-affirming Islamic organizations and individual congregations are primarily based in the Western world and South Asian countries; they usually identify themselves with the liberal and progressive movements within Islam.

Homosexual acts are forbidden in traditional Islamic jurisprudence and are liable to different punishments, including flogging, stoning, and the death penalty, depending on the situation and legal school. However, homosexual relationships were generally tolerated in pre-modern Islamic societies, and historical records suggest that these laws were invoked infrequently, mainly in cases of rape or other "exceptionally blatant infringement on public morals". Public attitudes toward homosexuality in the Muslim world underwent a marked negative change starting from the 19th century through the global spread of Islamic fundamentalist movements such as Salafism and Wahhabism, and the influence of the sexual notions and restrictive norms prevalent in Europe at the time: a number of Muslim-majority countries have retained criminal penalties for homosexual acts enacted under European colonial rule. 
In recent times, extreme prejudice, discrimination, and violence against LGBT people persists, both socially and legally, in much of the Muslim world, exacerbated by increasingly socially conservative attitudes and the rise of Islamist movements in Muslim-majority countries. There are laws against homosexual sexual activities in a large number of Muslim-majority countries, which prescribe the death penalty in a limited number of them.

Islamic views on homosexuality are also influenced by the rulings prescribed by the Quran and the teachings of the Islamic prophet Muhammad. The mainstream interpretation of some Quranic verses and hadith condemn sexual acts between members of the same sex, along with most forms of extramarital relations. In the late 1980s, Mufti Muhammad Sayyid Tantawy of Egypt issued a fatwa supporting the right for those who fit the description of mukhannathun to have sex reassignment surgery; Ayatollah Khomeini of Iran issued similar fatwas around the same time. Khomeini's initial fatwa concerned intersex individuals as well, but he later specified that sex reassignment surgery was also permissible in the case of transgender individuals.

Because homosexuality is illegal in Iran but transgenderism is legal, some gay individuals have been forced to undergo sex reassignment surgery and transition into the opposite sex, regardless of their actual gender identity. Therefore, transgender people are generally more accepted, provided they conform to traditional gender norms post-transition; for example, the Iranian government not only allows and recognizes sex reassignment surgery, but also subsidizes the procedure for transgender citizens. In some regions of South Asia such as India, Bangladesh, and Pakistan, the hijras are officially recognized as a third gender that is neither male nor female, a concept that some have compared to mukhannathun.

In France there was an Islamic same-sex marriage on 18 February 2012. In Paris in November 2012 a room in a Buddhist prayer hall was used by gay Muslims and called a "gay-friendly mosque", and a French Islamic website is supporting religious same-sex marriage. The Ibn Ruschd-Goethe mosque in Berlin is a liberal mosque open to all types of Muslims, where men and women pray together and LGBT worshippers are welcomed and supported. Other significant LGBT-inclusive mosques or prayer groups include the El-Tawhid Juma Circle Unity Mosque in Toronto, Masjid an-Nur al-Isslaah (Light of Reform Mosque) in Washington D.C., Masjid Al-Rabia in Chicago, Unity Mosque in Atlanta, People's Mosque in Cape Town South Africa, Masjid Ul-Umam mosque in Cape Town, Qal'bu Maryamin in California, and the Nur Ashki Jerrahi Sufi Community in New York City.

Muslims for Progressive Values, based in the United States and Malaysia, is "a faith-based, grassroots, human rights organization that embodies and advocates for the traditional Qur'anic values of social justice and equality for all, for the 21st Century." MPV has recorded "a lecture series that seeks to dismantle the religious justification for homophobia in Muslim communities." The lectures can be viewed at MPV Lecture Series. The Mecca Institute is an LGBT-inclusive and progressive online Islamic seminary, and serves as an online center of Islamic learning and research.

Baháʼí Faith

The Baháʼí Faith teaches that the only acceptable form of sexual expression is within marriage, and Baháʼí marriage is defined in the religion's texts as exclusively between one man and one woman. Baháʼís stress the importance of absolute chastity for any unmarried person, and focus on personal restraint. The Universal House of Justice, the elected governing body of the Baháʼí Faith, has stated that "the Faith does not recognize homosexuality as a 'natural' or permanent phenomenon." The Universal House of Justice has approved of and encouraged Shoghi Effendi's idea of possible medical treatment.
However, membership in the Baháʼí community is open to lesbian and gay adherents, who are to be "advised and sympathized with".

Dharmic religions

Hinduism

Hinduism has taken various positions, ranging from positive to neutral or antagonistic. Referring to the nature of samsara, the Rigveda, one of the four canonical sacred texts of Hinduism says 'Vikruti Evam Prakriti' (perversity/diversity is what nature is all about, or, what seems un-natural is also natural), which some scholars believe recognizes homosexuality as natural, if not an approval of homosexuality. Sexuality is rarely discussed openly in Hindu society, and LGBT issues are largely a taboo subject — especially among the strongly religious. A "third gender" has been acknowledged within Hinduism since Vedic times. Several Hindu texts, such as Manu Smriti and Sushruta Samhita, assert that some people are born with either mixed male and female natures, or sexually neuter, as a matter of natural biology. They worked as hairdressers, flower-sellers, servants, masseurs and prostitutes. Today, many people that identify as hijras are officially recognized as a third gender that is neither male nor female in India; they mostly live on the margins of society, and many still work in prostitution, or make a livelihood as beggars.

Several Hindu religious laws contain injunctions against homosexual activity, while some Hindu mythologies speaks favorably of lesbian relations and some third-gendered individuals were highly regarded by Hindu legends. Hindu groups are historically not unifyed regarding the issue of homosexuality, each one having a distinct doctrinal view.

The Indian Kama Sutra, written in the 4th century CE, contains passages describing eunuchs or "third-sex" males performing oral sex on men. However, the author was "not a fan of homosexual activities" and treated such individuals with disdain, according to historian Devdutt Pattanaik. Similarly, some medieval Hindu temples and artifacts openly depict both male homosexuality and lesbianism within their carvings, such as the temple walls at Khajuraho. Some infer from these images that Hindu society and religion were previously more open to variations in human sexuality than they are at present.

In some Hindu sects (specially among the hijras), many divinities are androgynous. There are Hindu deities who are intersex (both male and female); who manifest in all three genders; who switch from male to female or from female to male; male deities with female moods and female deities with male moods; deities born from two males or from two females; deities born from a single male or single female; deities who avoid the opposite sex; deities with principal companions of the same sex, and so on.  However, this is not accepted by the majority of Hindus, and is often considered heretical in nature. Those who do accept it justify with the belief that both God and nature are unlimitedly diverse and God is difficult to comprehend.

Several Hindu priests have performed same-sex marriages, arguing that love is the result of attachments from previous births and that marriage, as a union of spirit, is transcendental to gender. It is often regarded that Hinduism does not condemn homosexuality.

Buddhism

According to the Pāli Canon and Āgama (the early Buddhist scriptures), there is nothing saying that same or opposite gender relations have anything to do with sexual misconduct, and some Theravādin Buddhist monks express that same-gender relations do not violate the rule to avoid sexual misconduct, which means not having sex with people under age (thus protected by their parents or guardians), someone betrothed or married, and those who have taken vows of religious celibacy.

Views on homosexuality and LGBT rights differ in the Buddhist tradition. However, many Buddhist leaders and groups have been historically supportive and continue to be supportive of LGBT people. The renowned Thiền Buddhist master, Thích Nhất Hạnh, remarked that the spirit of Buddhism is inclusiveness and stated that "when you look at the ocean, you see different kinds of waves, many sizes and shapes, but all the waves have water as their foundation and substance. If you are born gay or lesbian, your ground of being in the same as mine. We are different, but we share the same ground of being."

Japan's culture and major religions don't have a history of hostility towards homosexuality. Same-sex marriages are performed at Shunkō-in, a Rinzai Zen Buddhist temple in Kyoto, Japan. Some modern Buddhist leaders were active in the movement for same-sex marriage rights in Taiwan, which legalized same-sex marriages in 2019. Some adherents of the Navayāna (Ambedkarite) Buddhist tradition are supporting LGBT rights within their larger activist activities. In Thailand, some leaders in the Theravāda tradition including Phra Payom Kalayano have expressed support for LGBT rights.

In 1997, the 14th Dalai Lama Tenzin Gyatso declared: "From a Buddhist point of view, men-to-men and women-to-women is generally considered sexual misconduct." However, this view expressed by the Dalai Lama is not based on the teachings of Gautama Buddha but derived from some later Abhidharma texts. Moreover, the Dalai Lama has repeatedly "voiced his support for the full recognition of human rights for all people, regardless of sexual orientation." In the most recent interview with the Dalai Lama on this topic (10 March 2014), the Dalai Lama said gay marriage is "OK", provided it's not in contradiction with the values of one's chosen religion. Also in the Tibetan tradition, the Nalandabodhi sangha has stated that they are welcoming of all sexual orientations and well-known Bhutanese lama Khyentse Norbu has expressed support for LGBT rights in Bhutan.

In Western Buddhist denominations, there is widescale support for LGBT rights from Buddhist groups and organizations, including the European Buddhist Union, the Buddhist Churches of America, many Shin Buddhist groups, and Zen leaders such as Thích Nhất Hạnh. The Federation of Australian Buddhist Councils (FABC), representing Buddhist laypeople, and the Australian Sangha Association vocally supported same-sex marriage in Australia. Soka Gakkai International-USA (SGI-USA) is the most diverse Buddhist community in the United States with more than 500 chapters and some 100 centers throughout the country supports LGBT rights. American Soka Gakkai Buddhists have performed same-sex union ceremonies since the 1990s. In a PEW research poll, 88% of American Buddhists stated that homosexuality should be accepted. This was a higher level of support than any other religious group studied.

Sikhism

The Sikh holy book, the Guru Granth Sahib, does not explicitly mention homosexuality. The Guru Granth Sahib is seen as the spiritual authority on all Sikh matters.  

Some modern Sikh leaders have condemned homosexuality. Giani Joginder Singh Vedanti of the temporal Sikh authority (Akal Takht), has condemned homosexuality while reminding visiting Sikh-Canadian Members of Parliament (MPs) of their religious duty to oppose same-sex marriage. The Sikh religious body, the Akal Takht, has issued an edict condemning gay marriage.

Other Sikhs point out that Sikhism does not condemn homosexuality or gay marriage reminding them that the Guru Granth Sahib leaves this as a matter of personal conscience.

Eastern and Southeast Asian religions

Chinese folk religion

Tu'er Shen, also known as the Rabbit God, is a gay Chinese deity. In 2006, Lu Wei-ming founded a temple for Tu'er Shen in Yonghe District in the New Taipei City in Taiwan, which has been called the world's only religious shrine for gay people. About 9,000 pilgrims visit the temple each year praying to find a suitable partner. The Wei-ming temple also performs love ceremonies for gay couples. It is the world's only religious shrine for homosexuals, and the temple performs love ceremonies for gay couples.

Confucianism

Shinto

Historically, the Shinto "had no special code of morals and seems to have regarded sex as a natural phenomenon to be enjoyed with few inhibitions." While Shinto beliefs are diverse, Shinto doesn't condemn homosexuality, and the formally organized Konkokyo sect is fully affirming. Multiple Shinto leaders advocated in support of gay marriage in Hawaii.

Zoroastrianism

Indigenous religions

African Diasporic religions

Homosexuality is religiously acceptable in Haitian Vodou. The lwa or loa (spirits) Erzulie Dantor and Erzulie Freda are often associated with and viewed as protectors of queer people.

Within Candomblé, a syncretic religion founds primarily found in Brazil, there is widespread (though not universal) support for gay rights, many members are LGBT, and have performed gay marriages. Practitioners of Santería, primarily found in Cuba, generally (though not universally) welcome LGBT members and include them in religious or ritual activities. Also a Brazilian syncretic religion, Umbanda houses generally support LGBT rights and have performed gay marriages. Homosexuality is religiously acceptable in Haitian Vodou. The lwa or loa (spirits) Erzulie Dantor and Erzulie Freda are often associated with and viewed as protectors of queer people. The lao Ghede Nibo is sometimes depicted as an effeminate drag queen and inspires those he inhabits to lascivious sexuality of all kinds.

Ancient Mesopotamian religion

Individuals who went against the traditional gender binary were heavily involved in the cult of Inanna, an ancient Mesopotamian goddess. During Sumerian times, a set of priests known as gala worked in Inanna's temples, where they performed elegies and lamentations. Men who became gala sometimes adopted female names and their songs were composed in the Sumerian eme-sal dialect, which, in literary texts, is normally reserved for the speech of female characters. Some Sumerian proverbs seem to suggest that gala had a reputation for engaging in anal sex with men. During the Akkadian Period, kurgarrū and assinnu were servants of Ishtar who dressed in female clothing and performed war dances in Ishtar's temples. Several Akkadian proverbs seem to suggest that they may have also had homosexual proclivities. Gwendolyn Leick, an anthropologist known for her writings on Mesopotamia, has compared these individuals to the contemporary Indian hijra. In one Akkadian hymn, Ishtar is described as transforming men into women. Some modern pagans include Inanna in their worship.

Pre-colonial religions of the Americas

Among the Indigenous peoples of the Americas prior to the European colonization, many Nations had respected ceremonial, religious, and social roles for homosexual, bisexual, and gender-nonconforming individuals in their communities and in many contemporary Native American and First Nations communities, these roles still exist. Homosexual and gender-variant individuals were also common among other pre-conquest civilizations in Latin America, such as the Aztecs, Mayans, Quechuas, Moches, Zapotecs, and the Tupinambá of Brazil and were accepted in their various religions.

New religious movements
Since the beginning of the sexual liberation movement in the Western world, which coincided with second-wave feminism and the women's liberation movement initiated in the early 1960s, new religious movements and alternative spiritualities such as Modern Paganism and the New Age began to grow and spread across the globe alongside their intersection with the sexual liberation movement and the counterculture of the 1960s, and exhibited characteristic features, such as the embrace of alternative lifestyles, unconventional dress, rejection of Abrahamic religions and their conservative social mores, use of cannabis and other recreational drugs, relaxed attitude, sarcastic humble or self-imposed poverty, and laissez-faire sexual behavior. The sexual liberation movement was aided by feminist ideologues in their mutual struggle to challenge traditional ideas regarding female sexuality, male sexuality, and queer sexuality. Elimination of undue favorable bias towards men and objectification of women, as well as support for women's right to choose their sexual partners free of outside interference or societal judgment, were three of the main goals associated with sexual liberation from the feminist perspective.

Modern Paganism
Most Neopagan religions have the theme of fertility (both physical and creative/spiritual) as central to their practices, and as such encourage what they view as a healthy sex life, consensual sex between adults, regardless of gender.

Heathenry, a modern Germanic Pagan movement, includes several pro-LGBT groups. Some groups legitimize openness toward LGBT practitioners by reference to the gender-bending actions of Thor and Odin in Norse mythology. There are, for instance, homosexual and transgender members of The Troth, a prominent U.S. Heathen organisation. Many Heathen groups in Northern Europe perform same-sex marriages, and a group of self-described "Homo-Heathens" marched in the 2008 Stockholm Pride carrying a statue of the Norse god Freyr. Research found a greater proportion of LGBT practitioners within Heathenry (21%) than wider society, although noted that the percentage was lower than in other forms of modern Paganism.

Wicca, like other religions, has adherents with a broad spectrum of views, ranging from conservative to liberal. It is a largely nondogmatic religion and has no prohibitions against sexual intercourse outside of marriage or relationships between members of the same sex. The religion's ethics are largely summed up by the Wiccan Rede: "An it harm none, do as thou wilt", which is interpreted by many as allowing and endorsing responsible sexual relationships of all varieties. Specifically in the Wiccan tradition of modern witchcraft, one of the widely accepted pieces of Craft liturgy, the Charge of the Goddess instructs that "...all acts of love and pleasure are [the Goddess'] rituals", giving validity to all forms of sexual activity for Wiccan practitioners.

In the Gardnerian and Alexandrian forms of Wicca, the "Great Rite" is a sex ritual much like the hieros gamos, performed by a priest and priestess who are believed to embody the Wiccan God and Goddess. The Great Rite is almost always performed figuratively using the athame and chalice as symbols of the penis and vagina. The literal form of the ritual is always performed by consenting adults, by a couple who are already lovers and in private. The Great Rite is not seen as an opportunity for casual sex.

Raëlism

Raëlism, an international new religious movement and UFO religion which was founded in France in 1974, promotes a positive outlook towards human sexuality, including homosexuality. Its founder Raël recognised same-sex marriage, and a Raëlian press release stated that sexual orientation is genetic and it also likened discrimination against gay people to racism. Some Raëlian leaders have performed licensed same-sex marriages.

Santa Muerte
The cult of Santa Muerte is a new religious movement centered on the worship of Santa Muerte, a cult image, female deity, and folk saint which is popularly revered in Mexican Neopaganism and folk Catholicism. A personification of death, she is associated with healing, protection, and safe delivery to the afterlife by her devotees. Santa Muerte is also revered and seen as a saint and protector of the lesbian, gay, bisexual, transgender, and queer (LGBTQ+) communities in Mexico, since LGBTQ+ people are considered and treated as outcasts by the Catholic Church, evangelical churches, and Mexican society at large. Many LGBTQ+ people ask her for protection from violence, hatred, disease, and to help them in their search for love. Her intercession is commonly invoked in same-sex marriage ceremonies performed in Mexico. The Iglesia Católica Tradicional México-Estados Unidos, also known as the Church of Santa Muerte, recognizes gay marriage and performs religious wedding ceremonies for homosexual couples. According to R. Andrew Chesnut, PhD in Latin American history and professor of Religious studies, the cult of Santa Muerte is the single fastest-growing new religious movement in the Americas.

Satanism
The Church of Satan has always accepted gays, lesbians and bisexuals since its foundation in 1966. The church supports legalization of same-sex marriages.

Scientology

Wicca

See also

Notes

References

Sources

John Boswell, Christianity, Social Tolerance and Homosexuality: Gay People in Western Europe from the Beginning of the Christian Era to the Fourteenth Century, University of Chicago Press, 1st ed. 1980 , paperback Nov. 2005 
Dane S. Claussen, ed. Sex, Religion, Media, Rowman & Littlefield, 2002. 
Mathew Kuefler (editor), The Boswell Thesis: Essays on Christianity, Social Tolerance, and Homosexuality, University of Chicago Press, Nov. 2005 
Eckhart Tolle, The Power of Now: A Guide to Spiritual Enlightenment, New World Library, 1st ed. 1999, paperback 2004 
Chana Etengoff. Petitioning for Change: Letters to Religious Leaders from Gay Men and their Religious Family Allies, Journal of Homosexuality. doi:10.1080/00918369.2016.1174022
Chana Etengoff & Colette Daiute. (2014). Family Members’ Uses of Religion in Post–Coming-Out Conflicts with Their Gay Relative. Psychology of Religion and Spirituality, 6(1), 33–43. doi: 10.1037/a0035198

Arlene Swidler: Homosexuality and World Religions. Valley Forge 1993. 
Stephen O. Murray and Will Roscoe (eds.), "Islamic Homosexualities: culture, history, and literature" NYU Press New York 1997
Wafer, Jim (1991) "The Taste of Blood: Spirit Possession in Brazilian Candomblé" UPP Philadelphia
Wafer, Jim (1997) "Muhammad and Male Homosexuality" in "Islamic Homosexualities: culture, history, and literature" by Stephen O. Murray and Will Roscoe (eds.), NYU Press New York
Wafer, Jim (1997) "The Symbolism of Male Love in Islamic Mysthical Literature" in "Islamic Homosexualities: culture, history, and literature" by Stephen O. Murray and Will Roscoe (eds.), NYU Press New York 1997
Ransom, H. J., Monk, R. L., Qureshi, A., & Heim, D. (2020, December 15). Life after social death: Leaving the jehovah's witnesses, identity transition and Recovery - Pastoral Psychology. SpringerLink. Retrieved March 3, 2023, from https://link.springer.com/article/10.1007/s11089-020-00935-0
Pew Research Center. (2022, June 13). Religious landscape study. Pew Research Center's Religion & Public Life Project. Retrieved March 3, 2023, from https://www.pewresearch.org/religion/religious-landscape-study/religious-tradition/jehovahs-witness/views-about-homosexuality/
Luther, R. (2023). What happens to those who exit jehovah's witnesses: An investigation of the impact of shunning. Pastoral psychology. Retrieved March 3, 2023, from https://www.ncbi.nlm.nih.gov/pmc/articles/PMC9803876/

External links
Changing Attitude (International)
"Religion plays an important role in the lives of gay Americans"
 LGBTQ Humanists